Artur Jesus Vieira (born 11 June 1990), simply known as Artur, is a Brazilian professional footballer who plays as a centre-back

Club career
Born in Rio de Janeiro, Artur graduated with São Caetano's youth setup, after a brief stint at Portuguesa. He joined Náutico in 2011, but failed to make a single appearance with the club.

In January 2013, after a year at União Mogi, Artur signed for Atlético Goianiense. On 1 February he renewed his contract, signing until 2016, and made his professional debut on 7 June, starting in a 1–0 home win against Paysandu.

On 10 October 2014 Artur scored his first professional goal, netting the winner in a 2–1 away success against Oeste. On 28 January 2015 he left the club, after having unpaid wages, and moved to Nova Iguaçu.

On 6 May 2015 Artur joined Fluminense.

In 2016, he was loaned to Goiás.

In 2019, he ventured into South East Asia and signed for Indonesia club, Barito Putera.

He went to Thailand after ending his season in Indonesia.  But he was released after half a season.

He moved to Singapore Premier League club, Hougang United for the 2022 season. However, his contract was terminated before the season starts due to undisclosed reason. Speculation was that he did not manage to secure a work permit to play in Singapore.

Career statistics

Club

Honours
Atlético Goianiense
Campeonato Goiano: 2013, 2014

Dragon Pathumwan Kanchanaburi
Thai League 3 Western Region: 2022–23

References

External links
Artur at playmakerstats.com (English version of ogol.com.br)

1990 births
Association football defenders
Brazilian expatriate footballers
Campeonato Brasileiro Série A players
Campeonato Brasileiro Série B players
Liga 1 (Indonesia) players
Associação Portuguesa de Desportos players
Associação Desportiva São Caetano players
Clube Náutico Capibaribe players
Atlético Clube Goianiense players
Nova Iguaçu Futebol Clube players
Fluminense FC players
América Futebol Clube (MG) players
Goiás Esporte Clube players
Paraná Clube players
Boa Esporte Clube players
PS Barito Putera players
Artur Jesus Vieira
Living people
Footballers from Rio de Janeiro (city)
Brazilian footballers
Brazilian expatriate sportspeople in Indonesia
Brazilian expatriate sportspeople in Thailand
Expatriate footballers in Indonesia
Expatriate footballers in Thailand